Ed Pollard (born 26 September 1962) is a Barbadian former professional boxer who competed from 1985 to 1996. As an amateur, he represented his country in the men's featherweight event at the 1984 Summer Olympics. Pollard also represented Barbados at the 1983 Pan American Games.

References

External links
 

1962 births
Living people
Barbadian male boxers
Olympic boxers of Barbados
Boxers at the 1984 Summer Olympics
Pan American Games competitors for Barbados
Boxers at the 1983 Pan American Games
Place of birth missing (living people)
Featherweight boxers
Southpaw boxers